Kissling is a German language surname. it may refer to:

Frances Kissling (born 1943), American religious leader
George Kissling (1805–1865), New Zealand religious leader
Grace E. Kissling, American biostatistician
Jorge Kissling (1940–1968), Argentine motorcycle racer
Margaret Kissling (1808–1891), New Zealand educator
Richard Kissling (1848–1919), Swiss sculptor
Walter Kissling (1931–2002), Costa Rican businessman
Werner Kissling (1895–1988), German ethnologist

Other uses
4409 Kissling, an asteroid
Kissling Farm, Pennsylvania

See also 
 Kisling

German-language surnames
Jewish surnames